The following is a list of reported scams and scandals in Malaysia since independence. These include political, financial, corporate and others. Entries are arranged in reverse chronological order by year. The year is the one in which the alleged scam was first reported or came into knowledge of public.

Notable scandals

References

Further reading
 
 
 
 
 
 

 
Corruption in Malaysia
Malaysia